Pacific Insects was a quarterly peer-reviewed scientific journal published by the Entomology Department at the Bishop Museum from 1959 to 1982. It was renamed to International Journal of Entomology in 1983 and discontinued in 1985. It was the organ of the "Zoogeography and Evolution of Pacific Insects" program. It should not be confused with Pacific Insects Monograph, nor with the new International Journal of Entomology, published since 2010 by the International Society of Zoological Research.

References

External links 
 

Publications established in 1959
Publications disestablished in 1985
Entomology journals and magazines
English-language journals
Quarterly journals
Academic journals published by museums
Bishop Museum academic journals